Leptobatopsis is a genus of parasitic ichneumon wasp. Species of Leptobatopsis are diurnal.

Taxonomy
Leptobatopsis contains the following species:
 Leptobatopsis abuelita (Ugalde & Gauld, 2002)
 Leptobatopsis annularis (Kasparyan, 2007)
 Leptobatopsis appendiculata (Momoi, 1960)
 Leptobatopsis ashmeadii (Brues, 1910)
 Leptobatopsis badia (Momoi, 1970)
 Leptobatopsis bicolor (Cushman, 1933)
 Leptobatopsis cardinalis (Chandra & Gupta, 1977)
 Leptobatopsis caudator (Fabricius, 1775)
 Leptobatopsis daedeokensis (Lee & Kang)
 Leptobatopsis flavoannulata (Chandra & Gupta, 1977)
 Leptobatopsis indica (Cameron, 1897)
 Leptobatopsis koreana (Lee & Kang)
 Leptobatopsis lepida (Cameron, 1908)
 Leptobatopsis luridofasciata (Chandra & Gupta, 1977)
 Leptobatopsis luteocorpa (Chandra & Gupta, 1977)
 Leptobatopsis maai (Momoi, 1968)
 Leptobatopsis melanomera (Momoi, 1971)
 Leptobatopsis mesominiata (Chandra, 1976)
 Leptobatopsis moloch (Morley, 1913)
 Leptobatopsis mongolica (Meyer, 1932)
 Leptobatopsis nigra (Cushman, 1933)
 Leptobatopsis nigrescens (Chao, 1975)
 Leptobatopsis nigricapitis (Chandra & Gupta, 1977)
 Leptobatopsis ochromaculata (Chandra & Gupta, 1977)
 Leptobatopsis orientalis (Chandra & Gupta, 1977)
 Leptobatopsis peterseni (Momoi, 1971)
 Leptobatopsis planiscutellata (Enderlein, 1912)
 Leptobatopsis prolata (Chandra & Gupta, 1977)
 Leptobatopsis spilopus (Cameron, 1908)
 Leptobatopsis v-maculata (Cameron, 1907)

References

Ichneumonidae
Ichneumonidae genera
Taxa described in 1900
Taxa named by William Harris Ashmead